Mondlane is a surname of Mozambican origin that may refer to:
Agostinho Mondlane (born 1959), Mozambican politician
Eduardo Mondlane (1920–1969), Mozambican communist
Janet Mondlane (born 1934), Mozambican independence activist
Nyeleti Brooke Mondlane (born 1962), Mozambican politician
Salomão Mondlane (born 1995), Mozambican footballer
Mozambican surnames